The city of Seattle, in the U.S. state of Washington, has many notable restaurants. As of the first quarter of 2017, Seattle had 2,696 restaurants. Seattle restaurants’ gross annual sales are a total of $2.9 billion as of 2016. Seattle is the fifth city ranked by restaurant-density with 24.9 restaurants per 10,000 households.

Current 

Notable restaurants currently operating in Seattle include:

 The 5 Point Cafe
 A+ Hong Kong Kitchen
 ʔálʔal Café (2022)
 Anchorhead Coffee
 Annapurna Cafe
 Archipelago
 Askatu Bakery
 Athenian Seafood Restaurant and Bar
 Ba Bar
 Bakery Nouveau
 Bar del Corso
 Barrio
 Bateau
 Bauhaus Strong Coffee
 Beast and Cleaver (2019)
 Ben & Esther's Vegan Jewish Deli
 Beth's Cafe
 Big Mario's Pizza
 Biscuit Bitch
 Blazing Bagels
 Bok a Bok
 Boon Boona Coffee
 Café Allegro
 Cafe Campagne
 Caffe Ladro (1994)
 Canlis
 Capitol Cider
 The Carlile Room (2015)
 Carmelo's Tacos
 Central Saloon
 Cherry Street Coffee House
 Coastal Kitchen
 Comet Tavern
 Communion Restaurant and Bar
 The Confectional (2006)
 Copine
 Copacabana Restaurant (1964)
 The Crumpet Shop
 Dahlia Bakery
 DeLaurenti Food & Wine
 DeLuxe Bar and Grill
 Dim Sum King
 Dingfelder's Delicatessen (2018)
 Drinkmore Cafe
 El Borracho
 Ellenos Real Greek Yogurt (2013)
 Eltana (2010)
 Emmett Watson's Oyster Bar
 Espresso Vivace
 Fisherman's Restaurant and Bar
 Fogón Cocina Mexicana
 Frank's Quality Produce
 Frelard Tamales
 Fuji Bakery
 General Porpoise
 Ghost Alley Espresso
 Glo's
 Goldfinch Tavern
 Gracia
 Grand Central Bakery
 Harbor City Restaurant
 Hello Em (2021)
 Hello Robin
 Hood Famous (2014)
 Jack's Fish Spot
 Jade Garden Restaurant
 Joe's Bar and Grill
 Joule
 Jules Maes Saloon
 Kamonegi
 Katsu Burger
 La Carta de Oaxaca (2003)
 Le Panier
 La Parisienne French Bakery
 Lark
 Le Pichet
 Life on Mars
 Linda's Tavern
 Lockspot Cafe
 Lost Lake Cafe and Lounge
 Madrona Arms
 Maíz
 Market Grill
 The Matador
 Matt's in the Market
 Mecca Cafe
 Mee Sum Pastry
 Meesha
 Merchant's Cafe
 Michou Deli
 Mike's Noodle House
 Molly Moon's Homemade Ice Cream
 Momiji
 Monorail Espresso
 Monsoon
 Musang
 Mr. D's Greek Delicacies
 Nacho Borracho
 Nue
 Oddfellows Cafe and Bar
 Off the Rez (2011)
 Omega Ouzeri (2015)
 Ooink
 Oriental Mart
 The Original Philly's
 Original Starbucks
 Osteria la Spiga (1998)
 Overcast Coffee Company
 Palisade
 Paseo
 Pegasus Coffee Company
 Phnom Penh Noodle House
 Phở Bắc
 Pike Place Bakery
 Pike Place Chinese Cuisine
 Pike Place Chowder
 The Pink Door
 Piroshky Piroshky
 Plum Bistro
 Poquitos
 Post Alley Pizza
 Rancho Bravo Tacos
 Ray's Boathouse
 Red Cow
 Red Mill Burgers
 Rhein Haus Seattle
 Rione XIII
 Ristorante Machiavelli
 Rob Roy
 Rubinstein Bagels
 Saigon Deli
 Saigon Vietnam Deli
 Salumi
 Sam's Tavern
 Serious Pie
 Shug's Soda Fountain and Ice Cream (2016)
 Skillet
 Spinasse
 Stateside
 Starbucks Reserve Roastery
 Storyville Coffee
 Taco del Mar
 Tacos Chukis
 Tai Tung
 Tamarind Tree
 Taurus Ox
 Tavolàta
 Taylor Shellfish Company, operates oyster bars in Capitol Hill and Pioneer Square
 Terra Plata
 Three Girls Bakery
 Torrefazione Italia
 The Triple Door
 Turkish Delight
 Uli's Famous Sausage
 Un Bien
 Via Tribunali
 Victrola Coffee Roasters
 Virginia Inn
 Vito's
 Volunteer Park Cafe & Pantry
 The Walrus and the Carpenter
 White Swan Public House
 Xi'an Noodles (2016)
 Zeitgeist Coffee
 Zig Zag Café
 Zylberschtein's

Defunct

Defunct restaurants include:

 Andy's Diner
 Bavarian Meats
 Country Dough
 Dacha Diner
 Iron Horse
 Last Exit on Brooklyn
 The London Plane
 Manning's Cafeterias
 SkyCity

Chains

Restaurant chains based in Seattle include:

 Dick's Drive-In
 Ezell's Chicken
 Ivar's
 Mighty-O Donuts
 MOD Pizza
 Pagliacci Pizza
 Red Robin
 Seattle's Best Coffee
 Starbucks
 Top Pot Doughnuts

See also
 Pike Place Market

References

Seattle
 
Restaurants